Rhythmic gymnastics is a sport in which gymnasts perform on a floor with an apparatus: hoop, ball, clubs, ribbon. The sport combines elements of gymnastics, dance and calisthenics; gymnasts must be strong, flexible, agile, dexterous and coordinated. Rhythmic gymnastics is governed by the International Gymnastics Federation (FIG), which first recognized it as a sport in 1963. It became an Olympic sport in 1984, with an individual all-around event. The group all-around competition was added to the Olympics in 1996. At the international level, rhythmic gymnastics is a women-only sport. The most prestigious competitions, besides the Olympic Games, are the World Championships, World Games, European Championships, European Games, the World Cup Series and the Grand Prix Series. Gymnasts are judged on their artistry, execution of skills, and difficulty of skills, for which they gain points. They perform leaps, balances, and rotations along with handling the apparatus.

History

Rhythmic gymnastics grew out of the ideas of Jean-Georges Noverre (1727–1810), François Delsarte (1811–1871), and Rudolf Bode (1881–1970), who all believed in movement expression, where one used to dance to express oneself and exercise various body parts. Peter Henry Ling further developed this idea in his 19th-century Swedish system of free exercise, which promoted "aesthetic gymnastics", in which students expressed their feelings and emotions through body movement. This idea was extended by Catharine Beecher, who founded the Western Female Institute in down in Ohio, United States, in 1837. In Beecher's gymnastics program, called "dance without dancing", the young women exercised to music, moving from simple calisthenics to more strenuous activities. In 1885, Genevieve Stebbins published her first book, The Delsarte System of Expression. She went on to develop "harmonic gymnastics", which enabled late nineteenth-century American women to engage in physical culture and expression, especially in dance. Stebbins provided the means, rationale, and model for what could be accepted as the appropriate practices for middle and upper-class women.

During the 1880s, Émile Jaques-Dalcroze of Switzerland developed eurhythmics, a form of physical training for musicians and dancers. George Demeny of France created exercises to music that were designed to promote grace of movement, muscular flexibility, and good posture. These styles were combined around 1900 into the Swedish school of rhythmic gymnastics, which would later add dance elements from Finland. Around this time, Ernst Idla of Estonia established a degree of difficulty for each movement. In 1929, Hinrich Medau founded The Medau School in Berlin to train gymnasts in "modern gymnastics" and develop the apparatus's use.

Competitive rhythmic gymnastics began in the 1940s in the Soviet Union. The FIG formally recognized this discipline in 1961, first as modern gymnastics, then as rhythmic sportive gymnastics, and finally as rhythmic gymnastics. The first World Championships for individual rhythmic gymnasts was held in 1963 in Budapest. Groups were introduced at the same level in 1967 in Copenhagen, Denmark. Rhythmic gymnastics was added to the 1984 Summer Olympics in Los Angeles, with the individual all-around competition. However, many federations from the Eastern Bloc and countries were forced to boycott by the Soviet Union, in a way similar to the boycott forced on many nations by the United States of the 1980 Moscow Summer Olympics. Canadian Lori Fung was the first rhythmic gymnast to earn an Olympic gold medal. The group competition was added to the 1996 Summer Olympics in Atlanta. The Spanish team won the first gold medal of the new competition with a team formed by Estela Giménez, Marta Baldó, Nuria Cabanillas, Lorena Guréndez, Estíbaliz Martínez and Tania Lamarca.

The gymnast

Olympic rhythmic gymnastics is typically restricted to female participants, although Japan has begun developing programs in which men can compete. In France, men are allowed to participate in women's competitions. In Spain, there is a national championship for men. The men's program has yet to be formally recognized by the FIG, however, and men cannot compete in the Olympics as a rhythmic gymnast. Gymnasts start at a young age and become age-eligible to compete in the Olympic Games and other major international competitions on January 1 of their 16th year (For example, a gymnast born on 31-12-2008 would be age eligible for the 2024 Olympics). Gymnasts in Russia and Europe typically start training at a very young age and those at their peak are typically in their late teens (15–19) or early twenties, but since 2004 it is common to see gymnasts achieving their peak after reaching their twenties.

Top rhythmic gymnasts must have good balance, flexibility, coordination, and strength, and must possess psychological attributes such as the ability to compete under intense pressure, in which one mistake can cost them the title, and the discipline and work ethic to practice the same skills over and over again.

Currently a gymnast can perform in the individual event or in the group event. They perform routines in 12 x 12 meter areas, accompanied by music (recorded or played by musician(s)). Since 1995, groups are consisted of five gymnasts, but originally six gymnasts composed a group, although around the 1980s this could be even eight. The duration of a group exercise should be two and a half minutes, one minute more than the individual one, which is one minute and a half.

In competitions, female participants typically wear leotards and rhythmic gymnastic toe shoes.

Apparatus
The FIG selects which apparatus will be used in competitions, only four out of the five possible apparatuses are sanctioned. Hoop and rope were the first apparatus used at World Championships, followed later by ball, ribbon and clubs. For 2011, rope was dropped for senior national individual and group competition. In 2011, it was to be dropped for junior national individual competition but returned again in 2015. Rope appeared in junior national group competition in 2011–2012.  In 2017, rope appeared in senior group competition. Freehand was an event for the four first World Championships before being dropped and only used in local competitions, usually for the youngest levels.

Since 2011, senior individual gymnasts perform four different routines with hoop, ball, clubs and ribbon. Senior group perform two different routines, one with a single apparatus and one with mixed apparatus (for example, a routine with 5 hoops and a routine with 3 balls / 2 ribbons). For junior individual gymnasts, the FIG selects four out of the five possible apparatuses. Junior groups perform two different routines with two different types of apparatus (for example, a routine with 5 hoops and a routine with 5 ribbons). As of 2017 rhythmic gymnastics equipment used in F.I.G. sanctioned events must come have the F.I.G. logo on the apparatus.

Rope It may be made of hemp or a synthetic material that retains the qualities of lightness and suppleness. Its length is in proportion to the size of the gymnast. When the middle of the rope is held down by the feet, both ends should reach the gymnasts' armpits. One or two knots at each end are for keeping hold of the rope while doing the routine. The rope must be colored, either all or partially. It may be either of a uniform diameter or be progressively thicker in the center provided that this thickening is of the same material as the rope. The fundamental requirements of a rope routine include leaps and skipping. Other elements include swings, throws, circles, rotations and figures of eight. Since 2011, the FIG decided to nullify the use of rope in senior individual rhythmic gymnastics competitions. Before 2013, jumps and leaps were the Compulsory Body Movement Groups (dominant in the exercise).

Customization: Ropes can be color dyed. It is not common practice because the majority of the paints are water-based and can start coming off with sweat.
 HoopA hoop may be made of plastic or wood, provided that it retains its shape during the routine. The hoop is chosen based on the gymnast's size and should not extend beyond the hip bone when placed standing up on the floor. The interior diameter is from 51 to 90 cm and the hoop must weigh a minimum of 300g. Children and hope divisions, a minimum of 225 grams. The hoop may be of natural color or be partially or fully covered by one or several colors, and it may be covered with adhesive tape either of the same or different color as the hoop. Fundamental requirements of a hoop routine include rotation around the hand or body and rolling, as well as swings, circles, throws, and passes through and over the hoop.

Customization: Hoops are often customized using colored tapes to match the design of the leotards.  

 BallIt is made of either rubber or synthetic material (pliable plastic) provided it possesses the same elasticity as rubber. Senior and junior gymnasts is 18 to 20 cm in diameter and must have a minimum weight of 400g. The ball can be of any color. The ball should rest in the gymnast's hand and not rest against the wrist or be able to be grasped. Fundamental elements of a ball routine include throwing, bouncing or rolling. The gymnast must use both hands and work on the whole floor area whilst showing continuous flowing movement. The ball is to emphasize the gymnasts flowing lines and body difficulty. Before 2013, flexibility and waves were the Compulsory Body Movement Groups (dominant in the exercise).

 Clubs Senior and junior clubs must weight a minimum of 150 grams per club. Children's and hope age division's minimum weight should be 75 grams per club. Multi-piece clubs are the most popular clubs. The club is built along an internal rod, providing a base on which a handle made of polyolefin plastic is wrapped, providing an airspace between it and the internal rod. This airspace provides flex and cushioning impact, making the club softer on the hands. Foam ends and knobs further cushion the club. The handles and bodies are typically wrapped with decorative plastics and tapes. Clubs are thrown from alternate hands; each passes underneath the other clubs and is caught in the opposite hand to the one from which it was thrown. At its simplest, each club rotates once per throw, the handle moving down and away from the throwing hand at first. However, double and triple spins are frequently performed, allowing the club to be thrown higher for more advanced patterns and to allow tricks such as 360s (channes) to be performed underneath. Before 2013, balances were the Compulsory Body Movement Groups (dominant in the exercise).

 RibbonIt is made of satin or another similar material cloth of any color; it may be multi-colored and have designs on it. The ribbon itself must be at least , 4–6 cm (1.6–2.4") in width and have a minimum length of 6m (20') for seniors and 5m (16.25') for juniors. The ribbon must be in one piece. The end that is attached to the stick is doubled for a maximum length of 1m (3'). This is stitched down both sides. At the top, a very thin reinforcement or rows of machine stitching for a maximum length of 5 cm is authorized. This extremity may end in a strap, or have an eyelet (a small hole, edged with a buttonhole stitch or metal circle), to permit attaching the ribbon. The ribbon is fixed to the stick by means of a supple attachment such as thread, nylon cord, or a series of articulated rings. The attachment has a maximum length of 7 cm (2.8"), not counting the strap or metal ring at the end of the stick where it will be fastened. Compulsory elements for the ribbon include flicks, circles, snakes and spirals, and throws. It requires a high degree of co-ordination to form the spirals and circles as any knots which may accidentally form in the ribbon are penalized. During a ribbon routine, large, smooth and flowing movements are looked for. The ribbon may not stop moving or else points are taken off. Before 2013, pivots were the Compulsory Body Movement Groups (dominant in the exercise).Ribbon is also known as the hardest apparatus in Rhythmic gymnastics.

Scoring system
In rhythmic gymnastics, competitions exercises are evaluated by parameters which are reviewed every four years, the system defining the FIG Code of Points. After each Olympic games, the scoring process is modified.

Code of Points
In the Code of Points (2022–2024), the final score of a routine is the sum of the difficulty, execution, and artistry scores. Penalties incurred are deducted from the final score. The difficulty score is open-ended with no maximum, while the execution and artistry scores have a starting value of 10 points. There are penalties which are applied by subtracting points from the final score for specific mistakes made by the gymnast.

Difficulty consists of body difficulties (jumps, balances and rotations), dynamic elements with rotation (commonly known as risks), dance step combinations (for individual gymnasts and groups), and apparatus difficulties (only for individuals gymnasts) and exchanges and collaborations (only for groups). The difficulty score is evaluated during the routine without a predetermined difficulty sheet, unlike with previous Codes. Each difficulty component has an assigned value, which accumulate throughout the routine, resulting in the final difficulty score.

Execution is the degree to which the gymnast performs with aesthetic and technical perfection. Scoring is not subjective. First, the unity and character of the composition, harmony with the music, body expression and the variety in the use of space and apparatus elements, among others are evaluated; next, the technical handling of the apparatus (like catching the ball with one hand and not two, not losing the apparatus, etc.) and technical aspects of body movements (like touching the head with the foot during a ring form, not falling, etc.) are evaluated. Errors or deviations from the perfect model of conduct accumulate and are assigned specific penalty values, which are subtracted from the starting value (an execution score of 10 represents a perfect execution matching the model, without error).

Finally, Penalties are taken by the time, line, and coordinator judges. Possible penalties include:

 The gymnast leaving the floor area
 The apparatus leaving the floor area
 The exercise being longer or shorter than the acceptable length of time (1'15" to 1'30" is the required length for individual, and 2'15" to 2'30" is the required length for group)
 Music not conforming to the regulations
 Dress of the gymnast not conforming to the regulations
 Communication with the coach during the execution of the exercise
 Verbal communication between group gymnasts during the exercise
 Grabbing a new apparatus from the side of the floor if the first apparatus is still on the floor area.

Evolution of the Code of Points
The first Code of Points was published in 1970. Since then, rhythmics gymnastics has known 15 different codes (1970–1971, 1971–1972, 1973–1976, 1977–1980, 1981–1984, 1985–1988, 1989–1992, 1993–1996, 1997–2000, 2001–2004, 2005–2008, 2009–2012, 2013–2016, 2017–2021, 2022–2024). Since 1984 and the first appearance at the Olympics, the Code of Points is renewed after each Olympics.

In the decades of the 60s and 70s, scoring emphasized the artistic side, with little emphasis on difficulty. In the 80s new difficulty elements were introduced to give greater prominence to flexibility and risk releases, and to encourage originality with emerging new devices. In 1985 the score was composed of: Composition (Technical + Artistry) was scored on 5 points and Execution was scored on 5 points. In 1997, the Code of Points was significantly changed, by dividing the score into Artistry (based on 5 for individual or 6 points for groups), Technical (based on 5 points for individuals or 4 points for groups) and Execution (based on 10 points), the perfect score being 10 points for individuals and 20 points for groups.

In the late 90s, there was an appearance of gymnasts whose exercise flexibility was used as a main element (Yana Batyrchina or Alina Kabaeva for example), which motivated a major change in the Code in 2001, doubling the number of required elements of difficulty (10 maximum during the 2001–2004 Olympic cycle, one difficulty could be composed of 2-3 difficulties; 18 maximum during the 2005–2008 Olympic cycle) and reduced the value of the artistic element, which was now combined with apparatus difficulty (also known as mastery) and risks. The final mark was then obtained by adding notes Difficulty (or Technical before 2005), Artistry and Execution, each with a maximum value of 10 points, so the final score would be a maximum of 30 points. During the Olympic cycle 2005–2008, the final score would be a maximum of 20 points to join the average grade of Difficulty and Artistry.

In 2009 the code was subjected to another important change. The final mark was obtained by adding notes Difficulty (12 difficulties with the body, masteries and risks), Artistry and Execution, each with a maximum value of 10 points, so the final score would be a maximum of 30 points. In 2013, the code introduced the Dance steps combination and an Execution score taking into account both technical and artistic execution. The score then was on 20 points with 10 points for Difficulty (9 difficulties with the body, masteries, 5 risks and dance steps combination) and 10 points for Execution (technical and artistic penalties). The 2017 code was very similar, with a difficulty strictly limited and differences among the best gymnasts heavily determined by the execution. Therefore, in 2018, the Difficulty became open for the first time.

Major competitions
According to the technical regulations defined by the International Gymnastics Federation (FIG), the only official competitions in which rhythmic gymnastics events are contested globally are: the World Championships; the stages of the World Cup series (including the defunct World Cup Final and World Cup qualifiers); the World Games; and the Olympic Games (as well as the Youth Olympic Games). Test Events for the Olympic Games were held in 2000, 2004, 2008, 2012 and 2016, and were also officially organized by the FIG. Since 2019, Junior World Championships are held every two years.

The nations which have earned at least one medal in official FIG competitions are:

 
 
 
  
 
 
 
  
 
 
 
 
 
 
 
 
 
 
 
 
  
 
 
 
 
 
 
 
  
 
 
 
 
 
 
 
 

Major rhythmic gymnastics tournaments not officially organized by FIG include the European Championships (as well as its junior division), the European Games, the Grand Prix series and the competitions at the Summer Universiade. Also, continental championships are held in the Americas and Asia, as well regional multi-sport events in which rhythmic gymnastics is part of the program, such as the Pan American Games and the Asian Games. Major defunct championships or competitions in which rhythmic gymnastics events were held include the European Cup Final, the European Team Gymnastics Championships, the Goodwill Games, and the Four Continents Gymnastics Championships (reserved for senior athletes from the Americas, Asia, Africa and Oceania).

Dominant teams and nations
Rhythmic gymnastics has been dominated by Eastern European countries, especially the Soviet Union (Post-Soviet Republics of today) and Bulgaria. The two countries were in rivalry with each other before the dissolution of the Soviet Union.

Soviet Union 

Before the breakup of the Soviet Union in 1991, Soviet rhythmic gymnasts were engaged in a fierce competition with Bulgaria. The first World Championships held in 1963 in Budapest, Hungary was won by Soviet gymnast Ludmila Savinkova and in 1967 in Copenhagen, Denmark the first Group Championships was also won by the USSR.

Other Soviet World AA Champions in individuals included Elena Karpuchina, Galima Shugurova and Irina Deriugina. Marina Lobatch became the first Soviet to win the Olympic Games in the 1988 Seoul Olympics. In 1991, The Unified Team was formed and saw a competition of the two Soviet/Ukrainian gymnasts, Olexandra Tymoshenko and Oxana Skaldina at the 1992 Summer Olympics in Barcelona.

Other notable Soviet gymnasts include: Tatiana Kravtchenko, Liubov Sereda, Alfia Nazmutdinova, Natalia Krachinnekova, Irina Devina, Elena Tomas, Irina Gabashvili, Inessa Lisovskaya, Dalia Kutkaitė, Venera Zaripova, Galina Beloglazova, Anna Kotchneva and Tatiana Druchinina.

Bulgaria 

Since the start of the inception of rhythmic gymnastics as a World Championship event, Bulgaria was in competition with the USSR; during the late 1960s and throughout the 1970s, Bulgaria has won 10 individual World Titles with its star gymnasts Maria Gigova (3 time World AA Champion), Neshka Robeva and Kristina Guiourova.

The 1980s marked the height of Bulgarian success known as the Golden Girls of Bulgaria, with gymnasts Iliana Raeva, Anelia Ralenkova, Lilia Ignatova, Diliana Gueorguieva, Bianka Panova, Adriana Dunavska and Elizabeth Koleva dominating the World Championships. Bianka Panova became the first rhythmic gymnast to make a clean sweep of all five individual events at a World Championship by attaining full marks. She also became the first rhythmic gymnast to get into the Guinness Book of World Records by her perfect performance of full 10 marks in all her routines (total of 8) at a World Championship, and received the trophy personally from the President of the International Olympic Committee at the time, Juan Antonio Samaranch.

The early 1990s were marked by the full domination of Maria Petrova, 3 time World AA Champion and 3 time European AA Champion. Other notable gymnasts include Mila Marinova, Dimitrinka Todorova and Diana Popova.

The early 2000s marked the decline of individual rhythmic gymnasts of Bulgaria, though with still a few notable gymnasts including Teodora Alexandrova, Simona Peycheva and Sylvia Miteva. Boyanka Angelova, who gained popularity among the public, retired early due to injuries. Newer Bulgarian individual gymnasts include Boryana Kaleyn, Eva Brezalieva and Stiliana Nikolova. Bulgaria is currently more engaged in group rhythmic gymnastics with successful gymnasts including Zhaneta Ilieva, Eleonora Kezhova, Kristina Rangelova, Zornitsa Marinova, Vladislava Tancheva, Hristiana Todorova, Tsvetelina Naydenova, Tsvetelina Stoyanova, Lubomira Kazanova, Reneta Kamberova and Mihaela Maevska. However, Bulgaria is the current Olympic champion in all-around group gymnastics, having won gold at Tokyo 2020.

Russia 

After the breakup of the Soviet Union, Russia has been the dominant country in rhythmic gymnastics since the start of the late 1990s saw the rise of stars like Amina Zaripova, Yanina Batyrchina and Alina Kabaeva. Oksana Kostina became Russia's first World Champion as an independent country.

In the 2000 Summer Olympics in Sydney, Yulia Barsukova became the first Russian to win the Olympic gold medal. Alina Kabaeva, who had won bronze in Sydney, went on to win gold in the 2004 Athens Olympics. Evgenia Kanaeva became the first individual rhythmic gymnast to win two gold medals in the Olympic Games at the 2008 Beijing Olympics and 2012 London Olympics. Margarita Mamun continued the streak of individual gold medalists at the 2016 Rio de Janeiro Olympics while the competition favorite 3-times World champion Yana Kudryavtseva took silver because of a drop in her clubs routine during the finals.

Other notable gymnasts include Natalia Lipkovskaya, Irina Tchachina, Natalia Lavrova, Zarina Gizikova, Laysan Utiasheva, Vera Sessina, Olga Kapranova, Yelena Posevina, Anna Gavrilenko, Margarita Aliychuk, Olga Belova, Daria Shkurikhina, Anastasia Maksimova, Tatiana Gorbunova, Uliana Donskova, Yana Lukonina, Anastasia Nazarenko, Anastasia Bliznyuk, Ksenia Dudkina, Karolina Sevastyanova, Olga Ilina, Daria Kondakova, Daria Dmitrieva, Ekaterina Selezneva, Alexandra Merkulova, Daria Svatkovskaya, Yana Kudryavtseva, Maria Tolkacheva, Aleksandra Soldatova, Dina Averina, Arina Averina, Irina Annenkova, Diana Borisova, Iuliia Bravikova, Anastasiia Tatareva, Daria Dubova, Vera Biryukova, Sofya Skomorokh, Daria Trubnikova and Lala Kramarenko.

The Russian Group has won five of the seven Group exercises held in the Olympics since it was included in the Olympic Games back in 1996 Summer Olympics.

Ukraine 

Even as part of the USSR, a number of Soviet gymnasts were trained in Ukraine or with Ukrainian origin including the first World Champion Ludmila Savinkova and Liubov Sereda. Ukraine has won 1 gold and 4 bronze medals at the Olympic Games. If you include all Ukrainian gymnasts /with those representing the Unified Team & USSR but with Ukrainian origins/, then they have won 2 gold and 6 bronze medals (Alexandra Timoshenko /gold & bronze/, Ekaterina Serebrianskaya /gold/, Anna Besseonova /2 bronzes/, Oksana Skaldina /bronze/, Olena Vitrichenko /bronze/ and Ganna Rizatdinova /bronze/). The mother and daughter tandem of Albina and Irina Deriugina played an important role in the success of RG in the country, raising stars like Olexandra Tymoshenko and Oxana Skaldina.

After the breakup of the Soviet Union, Ukraine continued its success in rhythmic gymnastics with Kateryna Serebrianska winning the Olympic gold medal at the 1996 Atlanta Olympics.

Other notable gymnasts include Anna Bessonova (two-time Olympic bronze medalist), Olena Vitrychenko (1996 Olympics bronze), Ganna Rizatdinova (2016 Olympics bronze), Tamara Yerofeeva, Natalia Godunko, Alina Maksymenko, Victoria Stadnik, Olena Dmytrash, Viktoriia Mazur, Valeriia Gudym, Yevgeniya Gomon, Oleksandra Gridasova, Anastasiia Mulmina, Anastasiya Voznyak, Kateryna Lutsenko, Olena Diachenko, Vlada Nikolchenko, Khrystyna Pohranychna and Viktoriia Onopriienko.

Belarus 

Belarus has had success in both individual and group rhythmic gymnastics after the breakup of the Soviet Union. It is worth noting that the first Soviet Olympic gold medalist at the 1988 Seoul Olympics, Marina Lobatch, was a Belarusian.

Since the late 1990s, Belarus has had continued success in the Olympic Games and has won two silver and two bronze medals in individuals respectively, with Yulia Raskina, Inna Zhukova, Liubov Charkashyna and Alina Harnasko.

Other notable gymnasts include Larissa Loukianenko, Ksenia Sankovich, Svetlana Rudalova, Aliaksandra Narkevich, Tatiana Ogrizko, Zinaida Lunina, Arina Charopa, Alina Tumilovich, Valeria Vatkina, Evgenia Pavlina, Maria Kadobina, Anastasia Ivankova, Hanna Bazhko, Elena Tkachenko, Melitina Staniouta, Elena Bolotina, Mariya Trubach, Katsiaryna Halkina, Julia Evchik, Alina Harnasko and Anastasiia Salos.

The Belarusian Group has won two silver and a bronze medal in the Olympics.

Other Post-Soviet Republics 
Azerbaijan is now amongst the top countries for individual and group rhythmic gymnastics. The development of the sport particularly boosted after Mehriban Aliyeva became the President of the Azerbaijan Gymnastics Federation in 2002. In 2007, Mariana Vasileva who was a former Bulgarian rhythmic gymnast and a coach in Levski club in Sofia came to Azerbaijan to coach Azerbaijani gymnasts. Since 2009, Vasileva has been appointed as head coach of the Azerbaijan Rhythmic Gymnastics Federation. Notable rhythmic gymnasts include 2011 World All-Around bronze medalist Aliya Garayeva, Anna Gurbanova, Dinara Gimatova, Zeynab Javadli, Lala Yusifova, Marina Durunda, Zhala Piriyeva, Elif Zeynep Celep, Ayshan Bayramova and Zohra Aghamirova. Azerbaijan competes at the European Championships, even though it is geographically located at the crossroads of Eastern Europe and Western Asia. Azerbaijan hosted a number of large competitions, including 2005 World Rhythmic Gymnastics Championships, 2007 Rhythmic Gymnastics European Championships, 2009 Rhythmic Gymnastics European Championships, 2014 Rhythmic Gymnastics European Championships, and 2019 World Rhythmic Gymnastics Championships.

In Georgia, Soviet rhythmic gymnast and 1979 World All-around bronze medalist Irina Gabashvili was of Georgian origin. Another notable Georgian is the dynamic Salome Pazhava, doing well in the Continental Games and World Championships.

Other Post-Soviet Republics, especially in Central Asia, have had considerable success in rhythmic gymnastics, including Kazakhstan and Uzbekistan. Notable Kazakhstani gymnasts include Aliya Yussupova, Anna Alyabyeva, Aliya Assymova and Sabina Ashirbayeva. In Uzbekistan, notable gymnasts include: Ulyana Trofimova, Djamila Rakhmatova, Elizaveta Nazarenkova, Anastasiya Serdyukova, Valeriya Davidova, Anora Davlyatova and Sabina Tashkenbaeva.

In Baltic states, Irina Kikkas became the first Estonian rhythmic gymnast to qualify to an Olympic Games and Viktoria Bogdanova became the first Estonian gymnast to win a medal at the Universiade. The Estonian Group has won its first medal at the European Championships in 2020.

Spain 

Spain has a great tradition in rhythmic gymnastics. Some notable success in rhythmic gymnastics for Spain include Carolina Pascual, the silver medalist at the 1992 Barcelona Olympics, Carmen Acedo who won gold medal in clubs competition in World Championships in 1993, Rosabel Espinosa, 1991 European Junior All-around bronze medalist, Almudena Cid who is a four-time Olympian (1996, 2000, 2004 and 2008) and Carolina Rodriguez. Newer Spanish individual gymnasts include Natalia Garcia Timofeeva, Sara Llana and Polina Berezina.

Spain is more engaged in group rhythmic gymnastics and the Spanish Group became the first to win the Olympic gold in Group rhythmic gymnastics since it was added in the 1996 Summer Olympics in Atlanta. The Spanish Group was formed by Marta Baldó, Nuria Cabanillas, Estela Giménez, Lorena Guréndez, Tania Lamarca and Estíbaliz Martínez. Spanish group also won the silver in the 2016 Summer Olympics.

Italy 

Like Spain, Italy is more engaged in Group rhythmic gymnastics; the Italian Group is 4 time Group World AA Champion and has won three medals (a silver and two bronze) at the Olympic Games. Famous group gymnasts include Marta Pagnini, Elisa Santoni, Andreea Stefanescu, Romina Laurito, Anzhelika Savrayuk, Elisa Blanchi.

Notable athletes include Samantha Ferrari who won a bronze medal in clubs at the 1991 World Championships, other notable individual gymnasts are Katia Pietrosanti, Susanna Marchesi, Julieta Cantaluppi, Federica Febbo, Veronica Bertolini, Alessia Russo, Alexandra Agiurgiuculese, Milena Baldassarri, Talisa Torretti and Sofia Raffaeli.

Israel 
Israel is a rising nation in rhythmic gymnastics. Israeli head coach Irina Vigdorchik, who moved from Moscow to Israel in 1979, said rhythmic gymnastics had been brought to Israel by Russian immigrants in the early 1970s.

The sport began its success in the 2000s with notable Israeli gymnasts including Irina Risenzon, Neta Rivkin who have placed in Top 10 in the Olympic Games finals. Other notable gymnasts include Katerina Pisetsky, Veronika Vitenberg, Rahel Vigdozchik, Victoria Veinberg Filanovsky, Linoy Ashram (the first Israeli rhythmic gymnast to win a gold medal at the Olympic games and an All-around medal at the World Championships), Nicol Zelikman, Adi Asya Katz and Daria Atamanov.

The Israeli Group has also begun to be amongst the leading Group rhythmic gymnasts in the World Cup and World Championship competitions, and has won its first gold medal at the 2016 European Championships. It has so far peaked twice by placing 6th in the Olympic games in Rio 2016 and Tokyo 2020.

Other European nations 

Germany has had considerable success in the sport, especially from the late 1960s to the early 1990s, with World medalists Ute Lehmann, Carmen Rischer, Christiana Rosenberg, Bianca Dittrich and 1984 Olympic medalist Regina Weber. The 1990s had notable gymnasts Magdalena Brzeska and Edita Schaufler, and in the 2000s with Lisa Ingildeeva, Laura Jung, Jana Berezko-Marggrander, Noemi Peschel, Lea Tkaltschewitsch, Margarita Kolosov and Darja Varfolomeev.

In Czechoslovakia, the 1960s and 1970s marked the peak of Czechoslovak rhythmic gymnastics' success with World medalists Hana Machatová-Bogušovská, Hana Sitnianská-Mičechová, Zuzana Záveská, Iveta Havlíčková and Daniela Bošanská. Other notable Czech gymnasts from the 2000s are Dominika Červenková, Monika Míčková and Anna Šebková.

Romania has enjoyed more success in artistic gymnastics, but also had their share of producing talents (especially in the 1980s and 1990s), like Doina Stăiculescu, Irina Deleanu, Alexandra Piscupescu, Ana Luiza Filiorianu and Andreea Verdes.

In Hungary, Maria Patocska became the first Hungarian rhythmic gymnast to win a medal at the World Championships. Other notable gymnasts include Viktória Fráter, Dóra Vass, Fanni Pigniczki and Evelin Viktória Kocsis.

Greece is primarily oriented towards Group exercises, especially successful during the 1996–2000 quad, but has also established in individuals notably with gymnasts Maria Pagalou, Evmorfia Dona, Eleni Andriola, Varvara Filiou, Eleni Kelaiditi and Panagiota Lytra.

France has had considerable success in Individual rhythmic gymnastics with Eva Serrano placing 5th at the 2000 Sydney Olympics; other French gymnasts include Delphine Ledoux, Kseniya Moustafaeva, Axelle Jovenin, Valérie Romenski, Hélène Karbanov and Maëlle Millet. The Group placed 9th in the All-Around competition at the 2017 World Championships and 6th in the 5 hoops final at the 2018 World Championships.

Asia and Americas 
Although European countries have been always dominant in this sport (only five World Championships have been held outside Europe so far, one in Cuba, one in USA and three in Japan) and only five individual gymnasts (Sun Duk Jo, Myong Sim Choi, Mitsuru Hiraguchi, Son Yeon-jae, Kaho Minagawa) and three groups (Japan, North Korea and China) from outside Europe have won medals at the World Championships, nations from North America, South America and Asia have won multiple medals at the FIG World Cup series.

Japan has a long tradition in rhythmic gymnastics. Since their first competition in 1971, the Japanese group has never finished lower than 10th (except in 2003, 16th) at an AA World Championships. In 2019, they became World Champion with 5 balls for the first time. Japan had and still has notable gymnasts such  as Mitsuru Hiraguchi, Erika Akiyama, Yukari Murata, Sakura Hayakawa, Kaho Minagawa, Sumire Kita and Chisaki Oiwa. Other countries in East Asia have developed world class gymnasts, such as South Korea with Shin Soo-ji, Son Yeon-jae, and China with Pang Qiong, He Xiaomin, Zhou Xiaojing, Zhong Ling, Sun Dan, Xiao Yiming, Deng Senyue, Liu Jiahui, Shang Rong and Zhao Yating. North Korea has had success in group rhythmic gymnastics in the 1970s to the early 1990s and individual rhythmic gymnastics with Sun Duk Jo and Myong Sim Choi.

Although it has not gained as much following compared to its artistic gymnastics counterpart, it is also a rising sport in the United States with some notable rhythmic gymnasts including Michelle Berube, Mary Sanders (a dual USA/Canadian citizen who has competed for both countries), Julie Zetlin, Jasmine Kerber, Nastasya Generalova, Laura Zeng, Camilla Feeley, Evita Griskenas and Alexandria Kautzman. Other up-and-coming nations in the Western Hemisphere include Canada, Mexico and Brazil, with some notable rhythmic gymnasts including Lori Fung, Mary Sanders (who also competed for the USA), Alexandra Orlando, Patricia Bezzoubenko, Cynthia Valdez, Rut Castillo, Angélica Kvieczynski, Natália Gaudio and Bárbara Domingos.

Men's rhythmic gymnastics

Japanese men's rhythmic gymnastics 

Men's Rhythmic Gymnastics (Men's RG, MRG) is an artistic sport which is performed to music on a  gymnastic spring floor. It is sometimes called synchronized tumbling, combining the dynamism of powerful acrobatics and perfection of synchronous moves. Athletes are judged on some of the same physical abilities and skills as their female counterparts, such as hand/body/eye co-ordination, but tumbling, strength, and power are the main focus, as well as apparatus handling, flexibility and movements called "Toshu ("freehand"). There are an increasing number of gymnasts, competing alone and on a team; it is most popular in Japan, where high school and university teams compete fiercely. As of 2016, it is estimated there are about 2,000 participants in Japan alone. Some of the outstanding rhythmic gymnasts have made most of their physical abilities for their second careers and become performers in the field of entertainment such as the world-famous circus Cirque du Soleil.

History 
Men's rhythmic gymnastics in Japan was originally created by adopting elements from Swedish, Danish, and German gymnastics. It has been taught and performed for many years with the aim of improving physical strength and health as early as the 1940s. Originally, both boys and girls used to perform this type of gymnastics, which is called "Dantai Toshu Taisou, literally "group freehand gymnastics". In 1967, the name "Shintaisou ("new gymnastics") was adopted as a translation of "Modern Gymnastics," which used to be done in Northern and Central Europe. On the other hand, rhythmic gymnastics for women has also been called "Shintaisou in Japan since it was first imported to the country. Currently, MRG and women's rhythmic gymnastics are both under the umbrella of Japan Gymnastics Association and major competitions are often held at the same venue. Men's RG consists of two types of events: group events of 6 people (freehand or no apparatus) and individual events using apparatus (stick, rings, rope and clubs). Both group and individual events are performed on a spring floor, allowing gymnasts to do various kinds of tumbling during their performance.

Individuals 
For individual performances, a gymnast manipulates one or two pieces of apparatus (double rings, stick, clubs, rope) to demonstrate their skill at apparatus handling, throws, and catches as well as the difficulty of the tumbling. The gymnast must work the entire floor area whilst showing continuous flowing movement. The permitted time for individual events is between 1 minute 25 seconds to 1 minute 33 seconds. During a competition, each individual gymnast performs four separate routines, one for each apparatus. Points are based a 20-point scale. The first 10-point scale measures composition (difficulty) based on technical value, variety, harmony between music and movements, and originality, while the execution of performance is a maximum of 10 points. The individual scores of all four routines for each gymnast are then added up to decide the all-around winner.

Groups 
Group performance includes non-acrobatic movements called "Toshu (handstands, flexibility exercises, balance, etc.), and rotational movements (tumbling and lifts). Group performances are done without using any apparatus. The permitted time for group events is between 2 minutes 45 seconds to 3 minutes. Points are awarded based a 20-point scale that measures difficulty and execution of the routine. Composition/difficulty of performance is scored out of a maximum of 10 points, based on technical value (such as difficulty of tumbling elements and movement elements), variety (variety of movements, change of formations, etc.), harmony between music and movements, and originality, with deductions for lack of required elements or stepping out of bounds, and so on. Execution of performance is scored out of a maximum of 10 points, based on quality of execution, accuracy of performance and synchronization, with deductions taken for mistakes or lack of movements in unison, etc. Some of the group routine videos went viral on the Internet, including Ibara High School's two routines in 2013 and 2016 and Aomori University's routine in 2009, which was dedicated to their deceased teammate. Many other MRG videos are also available on YouTube.

Internationalization 
On November 27–29, 2003, Japan hosted the Men's RG World Championship. This first championship drew ten countries from two continents: Japan, Korea, China, Malaysia, Singapore, Australia, Canada, United States, Russia, Ukraine and more. The 2005 World Championship included Australia, Canada, China, Japan, Malaysia, Korea, Russia, Singapore, Ukraine, United States and more. Men's RG is a currently recognized by the FIG.

In 2013, the Aomori University MRG Team collaborated with renowned Japanese fashion designer Issey Miyake and American choreographer Daniel Ezralow (Spiderman, Cirque du Soleil) to create a one-hour contemporary performance, "Flying Bodies, Soaring Spirits," that featured all 27 Aomori men's rhythmic gymnasts outfitted in Miyake's signature costumes. Held July 18, 2013 at Yoyogi National Stadium in Tokyo, the show drew an audience of 2,600. "Flying Bodies" was also captured in a 78-minute documentary by director Hiroyuki Nakano that follows the coaches, gymnasts and creative team for the three months leading up to the performance.

Men's rhythmic gymnasts of Aomori University showed their Performance at the 2016 Summer Olympics closing ceremony.

Spanish men's rhythmic gymnastics 
There are, particularly in Europe, some male rhythmic gymnasts who train and perform in the same way as their female counterparts and generally applies the same FIG rules as for women's rhythmic gymnastics. Spain is a pioneer country in the field, the Spanish federation having approved at national level a separate category for individual men since 2009 and mixed groups since 2020. Examples of rhythmic gymnasts include Rubén Orihuela (Spain), Ismael Del Valle (Spain), Jose Sanchez Diaz (Spain), Gerard Lopez (Spain), Thomas Gandon (France) and Peterson Céüs (France). However, the discipline is not recognized by the FIG, there is nearly no international coordination done so far to develop international tournaments and very few countries help men to start rhythmic gymnastics.

See also

 List of Olympic medalists in rhythmic gymnastics
 Aesthetic group gymnastics
 African Rhythmic Gymnastics Championships 
 Asian Gymnastics Championships 
 Commonwealth Rhythmic Gymnastics Championship
 European Team Gymnastics Championships
 FIG World Cup
 Four Continents Gymnastics Championships
 Gymnastics at the Asian Games
 Gymnastics at the Central American and Caribbean Games
 Gymnastics at the Commonwealth Games
 Gymnastics at the European Games
 Gymnastics at the Mediterranean Games
 Gymnastics at the Pan American Games
 Gymnastics at the South American Games
 Gymnastics at the Universiade
 Gymnastics at the World Games
 List of notable rhythmic gymnasts
 List of medalists at the Rhythmic Gymnastics FIG World Cup Final
 List of medalists at the Rhythmic Gymnastics Grand Prix Final
 List of medalists at the UEG European Cup Final
 List of Olympic medalists in gymnastics (women)
 Major achievements in gymnastics by nation
 Miss Valentine
 Pacific Rim Championships
 Pan American Gymnastics Championships 
 Rhythm and dance
 Rhythmic Gymnastics European Championships
 Rhythmic Gymnastics Grand Prix
 Rhythmic Gymnastics World Cup 
 World Rhythmic Gymnastics Championships

References

External links

 Fédération Internationale de Gymnastique 
 Rhythmic Gymnastics on the British Gymnastics website
 Rhythmic Gymnastics at About.com
 Rhythmic Gymnastics Music
 Rudolf Bode at the German Wikipedia
 Rhythmic Gymnastics Equipment

 
Summer Olympic disciplines
Gymnastics
Articles containing video clips